Linda Lê (1963 – 9 May 2022) was a French writer. She was a recipient of the Fénéon Prize, the Prix Wepler, the Prix Renaudot du livre de poche, and the Prince Pierre de Monaco literary prize.

Biography 
Lê was born in 1963 in Da Lat to a Vietnamese father and a French mother. Refugees of the Vietnam War, Lê and her mother moved to France in 1977. Her father stayed back in Vietnam and died in 1995.

She published her debut novel when she was 23. She was awarded the Fénéon Prize in 1997 for her book Les Trois Parques and the Prix Wepler in 2010 for Cronos. In 2011, she published 'À l'enfant que je n'aurai pas,' an autofictional letter which won the Prix Renaudot du livre de poche. In 2019, she was awarded the Prince Pierre de Monaco literary prize for her works as a whole.

She died on 9 May 2022, at the age of 58.

Works

Novels 
Calomnies, Paris: Christian Bourgois (1993)
Les Dits d'un idiot, Paris: Christian Bourgois (1995)
Les Trois Parques, Paris: Christian Bourgois (1997)
Lettre morte, Paris: Christian Bourgois (1999)
Cronos, Paris: Christian Bourgois (2010)
À l'enfant que je n'aurai pas, Paris: Nil (2011)
Lame de fond, Paris: Christian Bourgois (2012)
Héroïnes, Paris: Christian Bourgois (2017)

Essays 
Au fond de l'inconnu pour trouver du nouveau, Paris: Christian Bourgois (2009)
Chercheurs d'ombres, Paris: Christian Bourgois (2017)

References

1963 births
2022 deaths
French women novelists
Vietnamese novelists
Prix Fénéon winners
French people of Vietnamese descent
People from Da Lat
Vietnamese emigrants to France